Edwin Stavros Humphreys is a Welsh musician born in Y Fron in 1963. He is a member of the group Anweledig, whose style is a mixture of funk, reggae, ska and rock. He is also a member of Bob Delyn a'r Ebillion. He runs a small studio in his home in Pentreuchaf in North West Wales. He was nicknamed Edwin "Chwarae fo powb" Humphreys by Welsh magazine Golwg.

References

Welsh multi-instrumentalists
People from Caernarfon
1963 births
Living people